The Tri-State Collegiate Hockey League (TSCHL) is an ACHA Division II level ice hockey league. ACHA Division II level consists of players with previous Jr. A, AAA or Midget Major experience, along with high caliber high school experience. The level can range from varsity high school up to NCAA Division III skills, depending on the programs.

History
The TSCHL was formed in 2010 and consisted of eight teams for its first season. Only the University of Dayton remains in the league from the inaugural season.

A number of the league's current members were part of the now defunct Great Lakes Intercollegiate Hockey Association (GLIHA), while others in the past joined from the College Hockey East and the Midwest Collegiate Hockey League (MCHL).  All 11 members currently compete within the ACHA Division II Southeast Region. The league is separated into two divisions, beginning in the 2021–2022 season, for only the second time in its history. The only other time was in the 2018–2019 season.

Past champions

Source

Format
League teams play a 13-game league schedule with 2 games against each division opponent and one game against the opposite division, in addition to non-league games against other ACHA DI, DII & DIII teams. The TSCHL season concludes with an eight-team bracket league tournament at the end of the regular season in mid-late February, the top four teams from each division qualify.

Current teams

North Division

South Division

NOTE: Bowling Green, Miami, Michigan and Ohio State have NCAA Division I hockey teams competing in the Western Collegiate Hockey Association, National Collegiate Hockey Conference & the Big Ten Conference.

Former members
University of Toledo (2010-2014) moved to ACHA Division I
West Virginia University (2010-2015) moved to the ACCHL
Indiana University of Pennsylvania (2010-2016) moved to ACHA Division III
Wright State University (2010-2018) moved to ACHA Division II Independent; folded
University of Akron (2010-2018) moved to ACHA Division III
University of Cincinnati (2010-2019) moved to ACHA Division II Independent; rejoining the league in 23-24
University of Pittsburgh (2010-2019) moved to ACHA Division II Independent; folded

Current season

2022/23 season

NOTE: The TSCHL uses a 3-point scoring system.

# – Regular season champion
@ – Playoff champion
* – Clinched playoff berth
E – Eliminated from playoffs
( ) – Regional ranking

After games on February 5, 2023.

2023 playoffs

Southeast Regionals
Since the 2015–16 season, the conference has awarded the playoff tournament champion the automatic bid to the ACHA Division II Southeast Regional tournament. The tournament is held in late February with the teams ranked #3-14 in the region (including auto-bid teams) competing in a single-elimination format.

2013: Toledo lost to Virginia Tech.
2014: Toledo defeated Virginia Tech; lost to Penn State.
2015: Ohio lost to Liberty.
2016: #6 Ohio defeated #7 Rowan; lost to #3 Miami / #9 Louisville (BID) defeated #12 Princeton; lost to #4 Penn State in Overtime.
2017: #7 Ohio defeated #6 Cincinnati; defeated #3 Toledo / #8 Louisville (BID) lost to #5 Penn State.
2018: #11 Ohio (BID) lost to #10 Rider in Overtime / #4 Cincinnati defeated #9 Maryland; lost to #5 Toledo / #6 Miami defeated #7 Rowan; lost to #3 Liberty.
2019: #4 Cincinnati defeated #10 Ohio State; defeated #7 Miami / #7 Miami defeated #6 Delaware; lost to #4 Cincinnati / #10 Ohio State defeated #11 Virginia; lost to #4 Cincinnati.
2020: #7 Miami defeated #6 Penn State; defeated #5 Rowan / #8 Ohio State lost to #5 Rowan in double Overtime.
2021: ACHA did not hold the regional tournament due to the shortened seasons caused by COVID-19.
2022: #4 Miami lost to #11 Ohio State / #7 Indiana defeated #14 North Carolina; defeated #6 Penn State; defeated #13 Pennsylvania / #8 Kentucky lost to #13 Pennsylvania / #11 Ohio State defeated #10 Rider; defeated #4 Miami; defeated #9 Cincinnati.
2023: #3 Kentucky defeated #13 Pennsylvania; defeated #11 North Carolina / #4 Indiana defated #12 Louisville; defeated #6 Ohio / #5 Miami lost to #11 North Carolina / #6 Ohio defeated #7 Penn State; lost to #4 Indiana / #8 Michigan lost to #13 Pennsylvania / #12 Louisville defeated #9 Rowan; lost to #4 Indiana.

National Tournament
In the 2016–17 season, Ohio became the first team from the conference to advance to the ACHA Division II National Tournament that is held in March. In the 2021–2022 season, the conference sent two teams to the tournament for the first time.

2017: Ohio (SE #4) finished 0–3 in Pool A; lost to William Paterson (NE #1) 6–3, Grand Valley State (Central #2) 3-0 & UNLV (West #3) 3–1.
2019: Cincinnati (SE #3) finished 3–0 in Pool D; defeated Lindenwood (Central #2) 3–1, Northern Arizona (West #1) 5-4 (OT) & Keene State (NE #4) 6–3; lost in the National Semi-Finals to Florida Gulf Coast (SE #1) 3–2.
2020: Miami (SE #4) was to compete in Pool D; playing against Massachusetts (NE #1), Sault College (Central #2) and MSU Denver (West #3); tournament was canceled due to the COVID-19 pandemic.
2022: Indiana (SE #3) finished 0-3 in Pool D; lost to Northeastern (NE #2) 7-5, Mary (West #1) 4-1 & Wisconsin (Central #4) 5-2 / Ohio State (SE #4) finished 0-3 in Pool C; lost to Massachusetts (NE #1) 8-1, Dakota College (West #2) 5-3 & Trine (Central #3) 4-3 (OT).
2023: Kentucky (SE #3) finished 0-2-1 in Pool C; lost to Saint Thomas (Central #2) 3-0, Mary (West #1) 3-1 & tied Bentley (NE #4) 1-1 / Indiana (SE #4) finished 2-1 in Pool D; defeated Lindenwood (Central #1) 2-1, Montana State (West #2) 6-4 & lost to New Hampshire (NE #3) 5-3; will face Iowa (Central #4) in the National Semi-Finals on Monday, March 20th, at 8:00 PM EDT.

Past seasons

2011/12 season

# – Regular season champion
@ – Playoff champion
* – Clinched playoff berth
E – Eliminated from playoffs
( ) – Regional ranking

After games on February 19, 2012.

2012 playoffs

2012/13 season

# – Regular season champion
@ – Playoff champion
* – Clinched playoff berth
E – Eliminated from playoffs
( ) – Regional ranking

After games on February 16, 2013.

2013 playoffs

2013/14 season

# – Regular season champion
@ – Playoff champion
* – Clinched playoff berth
E – Eliminated from playoffs
( ) – Regional ranking

After games on February 16, 2014.

2014 playoffs

2014/15 season

# – Regular season champion
@ – Playoff champion
* – Clinched playoff berth
E – Eliminated from playoffs
( ) – Regional ranking

After games on March 1, 2015.

2015 playoffs

2015/16 season

# – Regular season champion
@ – Playoff champion
* – Clinched playoff berth
E – Eliminated from playoffs
( ) – Regional ranking

After games on February 14, 2016.

2016 playoffs

2016/17 season

# – Regular season champion
@ – Playoff champion
* – Clinched playoff berth
E – Eliminated from playoffs
( ) – Regional ranking

After games on February 12, 2017.

2017 playoffs

2017/18 season

NOTE: The TSCHL uses a 3-point scoring system.

# – Regular season champion
@ – Playoff champion
* – Clinched playoff berth
E – Eliminated from playoffs
( ) – Regional ranking

After games on February 14, 2018.

2018 playoffs

2018/19 season

NOTE: The TSCHL uses a 3-point scoring system.

# – Regular season champion
@ – Playoff champion
* – Clinched playoff berth
E – Eliminated from playoffs
( ) – Regional ranking

After games on February 9, 2019.

2019 playoffs

2019/20 season

NOTE: The TSCHL uses a 3-point scoring system.

# – Regular season champion
@ – Playoff champion
* – Clinched playoff berth
E – Eliminated from playoffs
( ) – Regional ranking

After games on February 8, 2020.

2020 playoffs

2021/22 season

NOTE: The TSCHL uses a 3-point scoring system.

# – Regular season champion
@ – Playoff champion
* – Clinched playoff berth
E – Eliminated from playoffs
( ) – Regional ranking

After games on February 13, 2022.

2022 playoffs

All 2022 TSCHL Playoff games broadcast on Indiana Hockey Broadcast Network live from the SportsPlus Center in Cincinnati, Ohio.

See also
 American Collegiate Hockey Association
 List of ice hockey leagues

References

ACHA Division 2 conferences
Ice hockey competitions in Indiana
Ice hockey in Kentucky
Ice hockey competitions in Ohio